Beatrice Jepchumba (born 25 November 1983, in Nandi Hills) is a Kenyan runner.

Competition record

Personal bests
1500 metres - 4:04.08 min (2006)
3000 metres - 8:35.07 min (2001)
3000 metres steeplechase - 10:11.5 min (2005)
5000 metres - 14:52.08 min (2006)

External links

1983 births
Living people
Kenyan female middle-distance runners
Kenyan female long-distance runners
Kenyan female steeplechase runners
People from Nandi County
Kenyan female cross country runners